Rangi Ruru Wananga Karaitiana (4 March 1909 – 15 December 1970) was a New Zealand musician and songwriter. Of Māori descent, he identified with the Ngāti Kahungunu and Rangitāne iwi. He was born in Dannevirke, New Zealand, on 4 March 1909.

He served with 28th New Zealand (Maori) Battalion during World War II, and led the battalion's concert party. After the war he assembled a quintet, and in October 1948 recorded a version of his song "Blue Smoke" with singer Pixie Williams to a Hawaiian-style backing played by Jimmy Carter's Hawaiians – the first record wholly produced in New Zealand from composition to pressing, and provided the début for the TANZA record label. It topped the New Zealand radio hit parades for six weeks, and It went on to be recorded by a number of overseas artists, including Dean Martin in 1951.

On 2 October 2019, Karaitiana, along with Pixie Williams and Jim Carter, was inducted into the New Zealand Music Hall of Fame, to mark the 70th anniversary of the release of "Blue Smoke".

Awards

Aotearoa Music Awards
The Aotearoa Music Awards (previously known as New Zealand Music Awards (NZMA)) are an annual awards night celebrating excellence in New Zealand music and have been presented annually since 1965.

! 
|-
| 2019 || Ruru Karaitiana || New Zealand Music Hall of Fame ||  || 
|-

References

1909 births
1970 deaths
APRA Award winners
New Zealand musicians
New Zealand writers
Ngāti Kahungunu people
Rangitāne people
New Zealand Māori musicians
People from Dannevirke